Raven Rock and Raven Rocks may refer to:

 Raven Rock (Kentucky), a sandstone protrusion
 Raven Rock, New Jersey, an unincorporated community
 Raven Rock, West Virginia, an unincorporated community in Pleasant County
 Raven Rocks, West Virginia, an unincorporated community in Hampshire County
 Raven Rocks (rock formation), West Virginia
 Raven Rock State Park, North Carolina
 Raven Rock Mountain Complex, Pennsylvania, an American military installation
 Raven Rock, a fictional settlement in the video game The Elder Scrolls V: Dragonborn